Ian Michael Walker (born 31 October 1971) is an English football coach and former professional footballer, he is the goalkeeping coach of Chinese Super League side Shanghai SIPG.

As a player, he was a goalkeeper who notably played in the Premier League for Tottenham Hotspur and Leicester City. He made 259 league appearances for Spurs and was their first choice keeper from 1994 until just before his departure in 2001. He also finished his career with a three-year spell in the top flight with Bolton Wanderers but all eight of his appearances came in cup competitions. He also had brief loan spells in the Football League with Oxford United and Ipswich Town. Walker was capped four times by England, he was part of the Euro 96 squad and would go on to be selected for Euro 2004. He was also capped at U21 and B team level.

Following retirement, he later became manager of non-league side Bishop's Stortford, before moving to China as the goalkeeping coach for Shanghai Shenhua in 2012. Two-years later he moved to rivals Shanghai SIPG in a similar role.

Club career

Tottenham Hotspur
After starting out with the team in the late 1980s as a trainee and having two loan spells away, at Ipswich Town and Oxford United Walker played in the winning 1989–90 FA Youth Cup Tottenham team overcoming Middlesbrough. During the early 1990s Walker was mainly used as the reserve keeper, making the odd cup appearance along the way, but after a serious injury to then Spurs keeper Erik Thorstvedt Walker took his chance and soon became the number 1 at Spurs, cementing his place in the side and getting his chance in the team during the first season of the Premiership making a total of 17 appearances in the league. 1992–93 season. Walker went on and made a total of 312 appearances for Tottenham Hotspur and played a big part during the 1999 season in helping Spurs win the 1999 Football League Cup Final after beating Leicester City 1–0 at Wembley Stadium. During the latter stages of Walkers career at Spurs he fell out of favour with the management and lost his place to the newly signed Neil Sullivan it was shortly after this, that the England international handed in a transfer request in September 2000. He played his final game for Spurs against West Ham United on 31 January 2001.

Leicester City
Walker signed a four-year contract with Leicester City in July 2001 for a fee of £2.5 million, rising to £3 million depending on appearances. His first season at the club ended in relegation to the First Division, which he felt may have ruined his dreams of an England call-up for the 2002 World Cup. Walker had an impressive season with Leicester as they regained promotion to the Premier League, earning his first England recall in six years in May 2003.

A cult hero to many of the Foxes fans, Walker had an indifferent season back in the Premier League, producing moments of magic, but unfortunately it all unraveled in a match against Aston Villa at the Walkers Stadium on 31 January 2004, in which he conceded five goals in 18 minutes. Walker put up such a poor display in the match that he was confronted by a Leicester fan who ran onto the pitch, telling him he "didn't think he was fit to be a Premiership player." On 10 February 2004, Walker scored a bizarre own goal in a match against Bolton Wanderers to give them a 1–1 draw at Leicester. Despite comfortably saving Kevin Davies' shot, he lost grasp of the ball as it crawled over the goal line. He did make a comeback performance in a goalless home draw against Wolves on 28 February, putting up a "world-class save" to deny Kenny Miller. Walker pledged to stay at Leicester despite their relegation from the Premier League in the 2003–04 season. He was released from Leicester City on 6 May 2005, after the club could not afford him a new contract. Walker spent four years at Leicester.

Bolton Wanderers
Walker joined Bolton on a one-year contract. Walker was the goalkeeper for Bolton's first ever European match away from England against Bulgarian team Lokomotiv Plovdiv, which was also his debut.

International career
Walker was capped by the England national team four times, making his debut in 1996 against Hungary. His most infamous game was against Italy in a qualification match for the 1998 World Cup where he is widely believed to have been at fault to a Gianfranco Zola strike. England lost this game to Italy 1–0 at Wembley Stadium. He backed up David James at Euro 2004 but was overtaken by others in the pecking order. Despite Walker's club Leicester suffering relegation from the Premier League, he played his first England match in seven years as a 61st-minute substitute for Paul Robinson in a 6–1 win over Iceland on 5 June 2004, which was also his last international.

Coaching career
On 14 March 2011, Walker was appointed as manager of Bishop's Stortford who were playing in the Conference South.

In April 2012, Walker joined his former Bolton teammate Nicolas Anelka at Chinese Super League side Shanghai Shenhua and became their goalkeeping coach. On 2 January 2014, Walker became the goalkeeping coach of Shanghai East Asia, another Super League team in Shanghai. On 15 May 2014, Walker signed a new contract with Shanghai East Asia, keeping him at the club until the end of 2017 season.

Walker continues to coach the 1st team goalkeepers at Shanghai SIPG FC. Walker has produced two national team goalkeepers for China, Wang Dalei from Shanghai Shenhua in 2012–13 and Yan Junling from Shanghai SIPG in 2014–15, both continue to be in the national squad with Yan Junling who is still coached by Walker the China number 1 goalkeeper.

In the 2018 season Walker was the goalkeeper coach when Shanghai SIPG won their first league title ever.

Personal life
Walker is the son of Mike Walker who was also a goalkeeper and managed Norwich City and Everton.

Walker attended Great Cornard Upper School. He and his former Page Three wife Suzi lived in a mock-Tudor mansion in Cobham, Surrey, as featured on MTV Cribs. After the birth of daughter Sophie in 1998, Suzi suffered Post Natal Eclampsia, and is an ongoing sufferer of Myalgic Encephalomyelitis. He became a father just months after the death of his mother Jackie after a long battle against cancer.

In 2006 Walker met Samantha Thurman and they had a son together Jaxson.

On January 28th 2023 Walker married Ximena Cortes Silva in Puebla,Mexico.

Career statistics

Club

International

References

External links

1971 births
Living people
Sportspeople from Watford
English footballers
English people of Welsh descent
England under-21 international footballers
England B international footballers
England international footballers
Association football goalkeepers
Tottenham Hotspur F.C. players
Oxford United F.C. players
Ipswich Town F.C. players
Leicester City F.C. players
Bolton Wanderers F.C. players
Premier League players
English Football League players
UEFA Euro 1996 players
UEFA Euro 2004 players
English football managers
Bishop's Stortford F.C. managers
National League (English football) managers
Shanghai Port F.C. non-playing staff
Association football goalkeeping coaches
Shanghai Shenhua F.C. non-playing staff
English expatriate sportspeople in China
Expatriate footballers in China